Eklakhi Mausoleum is a mausoleum located at Pandua in Malda district, West Bengal, India. It was built around 1425. It houses three tombs, possibly belonging to Sultan Jalaluddin Muhammad Shah, his wife, and son Shamsuddin Ahmad Shah, but the identification is disputed. The structure represents a village hut with a sloping roof and serves as a prototype for the various other buildings constructed during the Bengal Sultanate.

History
The mausoleum was built in the early 15th century. It houses three tombs. One tomb is believed to be that of Sultan Jalaluddin Muhammad Shah, the other two of his wife and son Shamsuddin Ahmad Shah. The orientation and the identification of these tombs is disputed. Jalaluddin was a son of Raja Ganesha and had later converted to Islam. He was the first native Muslim king of Bengal and the last Sultan of Bengal to rule from Pandua.

According to tradition, the construction of the mausoleum cost one lakh rupees. The mausoleum received its name "Eklakhi" from this amount. The mausoleum is an ASI listed monument.

Architecture
The mausoleum is the earliest surviving square-shaped building with a single dome in Bengal. The mausoleum has a smoothly curved cornice, terracotta ornamentation on the walls, and engaged towers at the corners. The cornice supports the hemispherical dome on square squinches.

A doorway is present at each of its facades. Each doorway has a pointed arch. The interior chamber measures  and has no window.

Historian Perween Hasan writes that the architecture may have been inspired by the brick temples in pre-Islamic Bengal. As Jalaluddin was the first native Muslim king of Bengal, he may have built the mausoleum in typical Bengali style, highlighting his roots. The mausoleum's structure represents a thatched hut with a sloping roof forming eaves. It is the earliest example of the distinctive Bengali architecture which was popularised during the period of the Bengal Sultanate and later.

Gallery

Notes

References

Bibliography

Monuments of National Importance in West Bengal
Architecture of the Bengal Sultanate
Mausoleums in India
Architecture in Bangladesh
Tombs in India
Buildings and structures completed in the 15th century
Tourist attractions in Malda district